The 2014 LPGA of Korea Tour was the 37th season of the LPGA of Korea Tour, the professional golf tour for women operated by the Korea Ladies Professional Golf' Association. It consisted of 29 golf tournaments, 25 played in South Korea, two in China, one in Taiwan, and one in Japan. Kim Hyo-joo won five tournaments and was the leading money winner with earnings of ₩1,208,978,590.

Schedule
The number in parentheses after winners' names show the player's total number wins in official money individual events on the LPGA of Korea Tour, including that event.

Events in bold are majors.

LPGA KEB-HanaBank Championship was co-sanctioned with LPGA Tour.
Kumho Tire Women's Open was co-sanctioned with China LPGA Tour.

External links
 

LPGA of Korea Tour
LPGA of Korea Tour
LPGA